Karamjyoti Dalal is an Indian para-athlete. She is a discus thrower. She is from Rohtak. She has won the bronze medal in the IPC World Para Athletics Championships. She studied at Maharishi Dayanand University, Rohtak and hails from Haryana.

Early life and Career 
Karamjyoti was a kabaddi player before her accident where she fell from the terrace which affected her motor sensation. She is a discus thrower and a coach. Karamjyoti Dalal is currently a coach at Department of Sports and Youth Affairs, Haryana.  She came to know about Para Athletics through her aunt.

Medals 

 Gold Medal at Fazaa Grand Prix in Dubai, 2017. 
 Two Bronze Medals at Asian Games in Beijing, 2014.
 Ranked as world no. 8 at Asian Games 2014. 
 Bronze Medal at World Para-Athletic Championship in London 2014.

References 

Indian female discus throwers
Indian sports coaches
Living people
Indian kabaddi players
Female kabaddi players
Year of birth missing (living people)
Paralympic athletes of India